Oregon's circuit courts are general jurisdiction trial courts of the U.S. state of Oregon. These courts hear civil and criminal court cases.

The state has 27 circuit court districts, most of which correspond to the boundaries of Oregon's 36 counties. The sixth, seventh, tenth, fifteenth, twenty-second and twenty-fourth districts cover two or more counties while the rest cover just one county each.

The courts are operated by the Oregon Judicial Department (OJD). As of January 2007, the courts had 173 judges. The majority of appeals from the circuit courts go to the Oregon Court of Appeals. Some limited cases go directly to the Oregon Supreme Court if appealed from the trial court level.

The OJD has no jurisdiction over other local courts in Oregon, which include county courts, justice courts, and municipal courts.

In 1998, the state combined its state district courts into the Oregon circuit courts.

Circuits
First Judicial District – Jackson
Second Judicial District – Lane
Third Judicial District – Marion
Fourth Judicial District – Multnomah.  Multnomah County Court. The chief prosecutor is the Multnomah County District Attorney.
Fifth Judicial District – Clackamas
Sixth Judicial District –  Umatilla, Morrow
Seventh Judicial District – Sherman, Gilliam, Wheeler, Wasco, Hood River
Eighth Judicial District – Baker
Ninth Judicial District – Malheur
Tenth Judicial District – Wallowa, Union
Eleventh Judicial District – Deschutes
Twelfth Judicial District – Polk
Thirteenth Judicial District – Klamath
Fourteenth Judicial District – Josephine
Fifteenth Judicial District – Coos, Curry
Sixteenth Judicial District – Douglas
Seventeenth Judicial District – Lincoln
Eighteenth Judicial District – Clatsop
Nineteenth Judicial District – Columbia
Twentieth Judicial District – Washington
Twenty-first Judicial District– Benton
Twenty-second Judicial District – Crook, Jefferson
Twenty-third Judicial District – Linn
Twenty-fourth Judicial District – Harney, Grant
Twenty-fifth Judicial District – Yamhill
Twenty-sixth Judicial District – Lake
Twenty-seventh Judicial District – Tillamook

See also 
 Government of Oregon
 Oregon Tax Court

References

External links 
 Circuit courts page hosted by the Oregon Judicial Department

Oregon
Circuit courts
Courts and tribunals with year of establishment missing